The Battle of the Brothers is the name given to the Utah–Utah State football rivalry. It is an American college football rivalry between the Utah Utes of the University of Utah and Utah State Aggies from Utah State University. Utah leads the series 79–29–4.

The rivalry began November 25, 1892, when Utah State (then known as Utah Agricultural College) defeated Utah 12-0 in the first game for both programs. For much of its history, whenever the two teams played in Salt Lake City, it was held on Thanksgiving Day. However, this aspect of the rivalry ended in 1958. Since 1959, no meeting has been played on Thanksgiving Day; and more recently, the meeting has been held in September as one of the first games of the season for both teams. Utah and Utah State have not competed in the same conference since 1961, meaning each meeting since then has been a voluntary non-conference game.

In the 1970s, Utah and its fans turned their sights towards Brigham Young University as their biggest rival, and the Holy War became the main rivalry in the state of Utah.

Following the Utes' 2015 win, no further meetings have been scheduled, and it is unclear when the rivalry will resume. In the entire history of the rivalry, the game has never been contested anywhere beside Logan or Salt Lake City.

Game results
Until 1957, the Aggies were known as the Utah State Agricultural College, or Utah A.C.

See also 
 Beehive Boot
 List of NCAA college football rivalry games
 List of most-played college football series in NCAA Division I

References

College football rivalries in the United States
Utah Utes football
Utah State Aggies football
1892 establishments in Utah Territory